Mack is an unincorporated community in Itasca County, Minnesota, United States, located within the Chippewa National Forest. The community is located between Deer River and Talmoon, at the junction of State Highway 6 (MN 6) and Mac Road.

Nearby places include Talmoon, Bowstring, and Marcell. Mack is located 17 miles north of Deer River; and two miles south of Talmoon. Mack is seven miles southwest of Marcell. Mack is located along the boundary line between Bowstring Township and Marcell Township.

ZIP codes 56657 (Marcell), 56636 (Deer River), and 56637 (Talmoon) all meet near Mack.  Lake Jessie Township is also in the vicinity.

References

 Mn/DOT map of Itasca County – Sheet 2 and 3 – 2011 edition

Unincorporated communities in Minnesota
Unincorporated communities in Itasca County, Minnesota